Pan Jia (born 8 March 1992) is a Chinese footballer.

Career statistics

Club

Notes

References

1992 births
Living people
Chinese footballers
Chinese expatriate footballers
Association football midfielders
China League One players
Hong Kong Premier League players
Guangdong Sunray Cave players
Sun Hei SC players
Meizhou Hakka F.C. players
Guangdong South China Tiger F.C. players
Chinese expatriate sportspeople in Hong Kong
Expatriate footballers in Hong Kong